The Church of Santa María de la Varga (Spanish: Iglesia de Santa María de la Varga) is a former church located in Uceda, Spain. It was declared Bien de Interés Cultural in 1991.

Built atop a former mosque, the church was erected in a Romanesque style in the 13th century by the Archbishop of Toledo, D. Rodrigo Jiménez de Rada.

References 

Bien de Interés Cultural landmarks in the Province of Guadalajara
Churches in the Province of Guadalajara
Romanesque architecture in Castilla–La Mancha
13th-century Roman Catholic church buildings in Spain
Church ruins in Spain